The 2022 ISA World Junior Surfing Championship took place across the La Bocana and El Sunzal waves at Surf City in El Salvador, from 27 May to 5 June 2022. It was the 18th edition of the event and was organized by the International Surfing Association (ISA).

Medal summary

Medallists

Under 18

Under 16

Medal table

References

External links
Official website

ISA World Junior Surfing Championship
ISA World Junior Surfing Championship
Surfing
ISA World Junior Surfing Championship
ISA World Junior Surfing Championship
ISA World Junior Surfing Championship
International sports competitions hosted by El Salvador